The Maze of Galious is a 1987 platform-adventure video game developed and published by Konami for the MSX home computer. A reworked conversion was released for the Family Computer. Both versions were re-released digitally for Microsoft Windows. The second entry in the Knightmare trilogy, it follows the respective hero and former damsel in distress of the previous game, Popolon and Aphrodite, as they embark on a journey through Castle Greek to free their unborn child Pampas from the evil priest Galious. The player explores each map in search for items and power-ups to progress, while also fighting enemies and bosses.

The Maze of Galious was created by the MSX division at Konami under management of Shigeru Fukutake. The process of making original titles for the platform revolved around the person who came up with the characters. A team of seven members were responsible for its development, lasting somewhere between four to six months, with Ryouhei Shogaki being the project's lead designer. The game garnered generally favorable reception from critics and retrospective commentarists. The game's exploration bits were utilized for Castlevania II: Simon's Quest. It was followed by Shalom: Knightmare III (1987). In the years since, fans have experimented with remaking and porting the title unofficially to other platforms, it also served as influence for La-Mulana (2006).

Gameplay 

The Maze of Galious is a platform-adventure game starring the warrior Popolon and his lover, the princess Aphrodite, as they embark on a journey through Castle Greek to free their unborn child Pampas from the evil priest Galious. Being able to control two characters means the player can switch between Popolon and Aphrodite, both of which have slightly different abilities: Popolon can push stones, open heavy doors and has a variable jumping height, while Aphrodite survives longer under water, can shoot more projectiles and has a fixed jumping height. The game's structure is similar to The Legend of Zelda; Castle Greek acts as the main overworld, where entrances to the ten "worlds" are hidden throughout. 

The player explores each world map, collecting items, defeating enemies and bosses, and obtaining power-ups to progress further. Similar to metroidvania games, new areas can be accessed by acquiring new items. Each map also hosts three hidden items to aid Popolon and Aphrodite against a "Great Demon". In order to face a "Great Demon", the player must inspect a gravestone that reveals an incantation to invoke them at a boss room by typing their names. Some items are optional but others are mandatory such as the "Cross", which is needed to face against the final boss. Enemies can drop random items after their defeat, ranging from that can be spent in shops to upgrade the character's overall inventory, arrow stocks for projectile-based weapons, and keys to open locked doors. 

There are several types of enemies, each with strengths and weaknesses; some monsters are immune to frontal attacks, while others are more vulnerable to fire and so on. The player can also kill enemies to fill an "experience" gauge, which replenishes a character's health when full. Another way to heal a character is entering a special room within the main overworld map, which contains a magic dust that can be turned into a fairy by standing at a certain spot. Should either character die, the other can visit a shrine and pay for resurrection. If both characters perish, the game is over, but the player can resume progress via passwords obtained from "Demeter's Shrine". Extra content is unlocked if the Game Master, Knightmare or Q*bert are inserted in the second cartridge slot available on most MSX machines.

Development and release 
The Maze of Galious, known as Majō Densetsu II: Gariusu no Meikyū in Japan, was developed by the MSX division at Konami under management of Shigeru Fukutake, who revealed about the creation process in a 1988 interview with Japanese publication Micom BASIC Magazine. Fukutate explained that the staffer who came up with the characters was in charge of design and facilitating development of the project, as the process of making original titles for the MSX revolved around the person who came up with the characters being assigned to do both planning and the story. Fukutate further explained that the planner would then lead a team of four or five members to proceed with development, which would last somewhere between four to six months. Seven staffers were responsible for the project: director and designer Ryouhei "Ryokun" Shogaki, programmers Masahiko "Mai" Ozawa and Yutaka "Hal" Haruki, artist Chiaki Tanigaki, composer Kazuhiko Uehara, and two members under the pseudonyms "Hipo" and "Tomoyo". Other people also collaborated in its development. Maze of Galious was the first game Uehara worked on after joining Konami in 1986 as sound designer; He would be responsible for creating the SCC sound chip, as well as working on Space Manbow and Metal Gear 2: Solid Snake. The team revealed in a 1987 article that they never decided upon the gender of Pampas, while an eleventh map consisting of twenty screens was scrapped due to memory constrains.

Prior to launch, a game titled Majou Densetsu II: Poporon Gekitou Hen was scheduled to be published in 1987 by Konami for the PC-8801 and X1 home computers. The game was intended to be a vertical-scrolling shooter similar to Knightmare but with role-playing elements added. It was never released for unknown reasons despite being advertised and previewed in Japanese magazines. The Maze of Galious was first published for the MSX in Japan on April 18, 1987, and later in Europe of that year by Konami. A few months after the original release, a completely reworked conversion titled Majou Densetsu II: Daima Shikyou Gariusu was released for the Family Computer exclusively in Japan by Konami on August 11, featuring changes such as improved visuals and redesigned maps. Although it was not officially released outside Japan, an English fan translation for the Famicom version was released online. Both versions were first re-released in digital form for Microsoft Windows on the i-Revo store front. In 2006, the full soundtrack of the Famicom version was included as part of a compilation album titled Legend Of Game Music Consumer Box, distributed in Japan by Scitron. The MSX version was also re-released in digital form for Windows through D4 Enterprise's Project EGG service on March 24, 2015.

Reception 

The Maze of Galious on MSX garnered generally favorable reception from critics. The Japanese MSX Magazine praised its graphics, character sprites, soundtrack, and playability. An editor for MSX Gids shared similar thoughts, lauding the visuals, sound, and overall quality. MSX Computer Magazine compared the title with Vampire Killer due to its similar setup and game structure, but also found it more difficult than the original Knightmare. Regardless, the editor commended the varied graphical design, music and sound effects. Spanish publication Input MSX also comaped it with Vampire Killer but highlighted its variety of enemies and weapons, as well as the way each world are divided, while giving positive remarks to the imaginative and colorful graphical quality, character animations, and audio. Micros MSXs Yannick Gallois echoed a similar opinion about the audiovisual presentation. In contrast to most reviewers, Tilts Mathieu Brisou felt that the game's execution was not on par, unfavorably comparing it with Knightmare in terms of visuals. Readers of Family Computer Magazine (Famimaga) voted to give the Family Computer version a 19.79 out of 30 score in a 1991 public poll. Famimaga found the Famicom version to be more fun compared to the MSX original.

Retrospective commentaries for The Maze of Galious have been equally favorable. MeriStations David Pérez García and Francisco Alberto Serrano identified it as one of the best games for the MSX, noting the lack of slowdown and soundtrack. IGN Spains Jaume Esteve also listed Maze of Galious as one of the ten best games by Konami for the MSX. Hardcore Gaming 101 expressed that neither version of Galious were among Konami's best work, stating that "compared to Falcom's Legacy of the Wizard, also released that year, they're downright dull. But there are just enough good ideas here to make you wish Konami took another crack at this incarnation of the Knightmare series."

Legacy 
The Maze of Galious, particularly the original MSX version, served as influence for La-Mulana (2006). In addition, the exploration bits from the game were ultimately utilized for Castlevania II: Simon's Quest. In the years since, fans have experimented with remaking and porting the title unofficially to other platforms. In 2002, a remake based on the original MSX version for PCs was released online by the group Brain Games, featuring updated visuals and different graphic sets. In 2015, a conversion for the ColecoVision was announced to be in development by Opcode Games, requiring the Super Game Module expansion to run on the hardware. That same year, a port for the ZX Spectrum developed by Climacus and McNeil was released online. In 2022, a mod that supports the MSX2 hardware was released online by Víctor Martínez and David Madurga, which allows improved visuals by Toni Galvez and other changes.

Notes

References

External links 

 The Maze of Galious at GameFAQs
 The Maze of Galious at Giant Bomb
 
 

1987 video games
D4 Enterprise games
Konami games
Metroidvania games
MSX games
Nintendo Entertainment System games
Video games developed in Japan
Video games featuring female protagonists
Video games scored by Kinuyo Yamashita
Video games scored by Kiyohiro Sada
Video games set in castles
Windows games